Heather A. Knutson is an astrophysicist and professor at California Institute of Technology in the Division of Geological and Planetary Sciences. Her research is focused on the study of exoplanets, their composition and formation. She won the American Astronomical Society's Newton Lacy Pierce Prize in Astronomy for her work in exoplanetary atmospheres.

Popular Science calls her "the first exoplanet meteorologist, determining the local temperature, weather, and even composition of the atmosphere".

Academic career 

As an undergraduate in the physics department of Johns Hopkins University, Knutson worked part-time as an intern with the Space Telescope Science Institute. In 2004, she graduated with a B.S. in physics with both departmental and university honors.

She defended her Ph.D. thesis in 2009, and obtained the title of Doctor of Philosophy in astronomy from Harvard University in 2009. Her most recent discovery is that approximately half of the systems harboring gas giant planets have distant massive companions orbiting them, a result that further supports the idea of planetary migration in the formation of hot Jupiters.

Awards 
Presidential Early Career Award for Scientists and Engineers
 National Science Foundation CAREER (Faculty Early Career Development) Award, 2016
 Newton Lacy Pierce Prize in Astronomy, American Astronomical Society, 2015
 Alfred P. Sloan Research Fellow in Physics, 2015
 Annie Jump Cannon Award in Astronomy, American Astronomical Society, 2013
 Harvard-Smithsonian Center for Astrophysics, Bart J. Bok Prize, 2012
 Harvard University Fireman Graduate Fellowship, 2009
 Harvard Merit Fellowship, 2008
 National Science Foundation Graduate Research Fellowship, 2004

References

External links
Official website

Johns Hopkins University alumni
American women astronomers
Harvard Graduate School of Arts and Sciences alumni
Living people
California Institute of Technology faculty
Recipients of the Annie J. Cannon Award in Astronomy
Year of birth missing (living people)
21st-century American astronomers
21st-century American women scientists
American women academics